The Lebanese Academy of Sciences, known officially by its French name Académie des Sciences du Liban (ASL), is a learned society  dedicated to promoting the growth, invigoration, and dissemination of the sciences in Lebanon, and to fostering a world-class scientific culture in the country.  The ASL was recognized by a decree of the Government of the Republic of Lebanon in August 2007. Membership in the ASL is a merit-based high honor  conferred by election.

Mission
According to its charter, the ASL aims to
 Provide independent advice and guidance to governmental and private institutions on matters of scientific research and education.
 Encourage, initiate and aid research and educational programs in the sciences.
 Help the dissemination and promulgation of the results of scientific research.
 Facilitate the exchange of ideas and results with similar institutions around the world.
 Bestow awards and honors on distinguished scientists.
 Exhort young Lebanese men and women to consider careers in the sciences.
 Strengthen the links between the sciences and society by addressing the needs of the population, public health, the economy and the environment.

History
The formation of the ASL was shepherded by the French Academy of Sciences, which also hosted the first meeting of the ASL in Paris on June 27, 2008.   The first meeting of the ASL's Executive Committee was held in Beirut, Lebanon on October 29–31, 2008.  The ASL is broadly fashioned after the French Academy of Sciences, with which it continues to develop joint programs.

Members

The members of the ASL are prominent Lebanese scientists working inside and outside of Lebanon, as well as distinguished foreign scientists, including some who are of Lebanese origin, or who are keen to contribute to the growth of the sciences in Lebanon. All ASL academicians provide their services pro bono, i.e. voluntarily and without payment, as a public service.

ASL Members:

 Huda Akil
  Sir Michael Atiyah* (deceased 2019)
 Jean-François Bach*
 Kamal Badr 
 Georges Bahr (Home Secretary, 2007--, Section of Health/Environment)*
 Catherine Bréchignac
 André Capron
 Ali Hani Chamseddine (Home Secretary, 2018--, Section of Fundamental Sciences/Energy)
 Moustafa Chahine (deceased 2011)
 Edgar Choueiri (Founding President, 2007-2014)*
 Jean Dercourt*  (retired)
 Charles Elachi
 Charbel Farhat
 Nesreen Ghaddar (Vice-President)
 Makhluf Haddadin
 Mohamed Hassan*
 George Helou (President, 2014-2018)
Samia Khoury
 Fadlo Khuri
 André Megarbane
 June Nasrallah * (President, 2018--)
 Mona Nemer*
 Jean-Loup Puget
 Yves Quéré*
 Mohamed Sayegh
 Edward Sion*  (Treasurer)
 Makram Suidan
 Samir Zard*
 Hussein M. Zbib 
 Fuad Ziyadeh
 Huda Zoghbi

asterisk (*) denotes founding member

References

External links
 Official website of the Lebanese Academy of Sciences

Lists of members of learned societies
Lebanon
Science and technology in Lebanon
Scientific organisations based in Lebanon
2007 establishments in Lebanon
Scientific organizations established in 2007